Ñiquén is a commune of the Punilla Province, located in the north of the Ñuble Region of Chile. Geographically, it is delimited by the Perquilauquén River to the north and the Ñiquén River in the south. Its boundary to the north is the commune of Parral and to the west that of Cauquenes both in the Maule Region, to the south with the commune of San Carlos, and to the east with San Fabian de Alico. The town of San Gregorio is the capital of this commune.

Demographics
Of these, 1,143 (10%) lived in urban areas and 10,278 (90%) in rural areas. The population fell by 13.2% (1735 persons) between the 1992 and 2002 censuses.

Administration
As a commune, Ñiquén is a third-level administrative division of Chile administered by a municipal council, headed by an alcalde who is directly elected every four years. The 2008-2012 alcalde is Domingo Garrido Torres (PPD).

Within the electoral divisions of Chile, Ñiquén is represented in the Chamber of Deputies by Jorge Sabag (PDC) and Frank Sauerbaum (RN) as part of the 42nd electoral district, together with San Fabián, San Carlos, San Nicolás, Ninhue, Quirihue, Cobquecura, Treguaco, Portezuelo, Coelemu, Ránquil, Quillón, Bulnes, Cabrero and Yumbel. The commune is represented in the Senate by Alejandro Navarro Brain (MAS) and Hosain Sabag Castillo (PDC) as part of the 12th senatorial constituency (Biobío-Cordillera).

References

External links
  Municipality of Ñiquén

Geography of Ñuble Region
1891 establishments in Chile